Catherine Mosley is a master printmaker. She attended University of Wisconsin–Stout. In 1969 she began working at Robert Blackburn's Printmaking Workshop. In 1974 she established a studio where she printed with the artists Robert Beauchamp, Agnes Denes, Richard Haas, Lucio Pozzi, and Harvey Quaytman. Mosley collaborated with Robert Motherwell from the early 1970s until his death in 1991. In 2015 Mosley had a solo exhibition entitled Up Down & Sideways at the A.I.R. Gallery

Her prints are in the Metropolitan Museum of Art, the Museum of Modern Art, the Smithsonian American Art Museum. and the Zimmerli Art Museum at Rutgers University.

References

External links
 The Artist-Printer Collaboration with Catherine Mosley 2012 gallery talk at the Provincetown Art Association and Museum (PAAM)

Living people
American women printmakers
20th-century American printmakers
20th-century American women artists
Year of birth missing (living people)